Lake Managua, also known as Lake Xolotlán, is a lake in Nicaragua. Similarly to the name of Lake Nicaragua, its other name comes from the Nahuatl language, possibly from the Spanish Tlaxcalan and Mexica allies or the Nawat Nicarao that were already there in today Rivas Department. The city of Managua, the capital of Nicaragua, lies on its southwestern shore.

Islands 

There are two uninhabited lake islands:

 , a volcanic island. There is another nearby volcano, on the mainland: Momotombo.
 Isla Rosa, an islet

Floodings
The level of Lake Managua raises significantly during the periods of heavy rain. The highest water level was recorded during the flooding of 1933.

The lake rose 3 metres (10 ft) in five days during Hurricane Mitch in 1998, destroying the homes of many who lived on its edge.  An even higher flooding occurred in September/October 2010. Since then, the city has prohibited residential use of the most flood-prone areas, those with the elevation below 42.76 meters above sea level.

Pollution
Lake Managua has been described by some authors as "the most contaminated lake in Central America."
The lake has been severely polluted, mostly by decades of sewage being dumped into the lake. The city sewers have drained into the lake since 1927. It was only in 2009 that a modern wastewater treatment plant (built and operated by the British company Biwater) was opened in Managua, but even it treats only 40% of the city's wastewater.

The lake today has no stable outlet, with only occasional floods to Lake Nicaragua through the Tipitapa River. Pollutants are thus concentrated. Despite the pollution, some of the people of Managua still live along the lake's shores and eat the fish.

In 2007 the  area was dredged, and the sediment hauled off on barges. A strong odor which permeated the area from the sediment disappeared.  A stone rip-rap and concrete wharf was constructed, and a sightseeing boat called La Novia de Xolotlán makes hour-long lake tours when there are sufficient tourists.

Wildlife
About 20 fish species still survive in Lake Managua.

While joined to Lake Nicaragua, the bull sharks of that lake cannot migrate to Lake Managua due to a  waterfall on the Tipitapa River.

Gallery

References

External links 

JPL NASA: PIA03365: Perspective View with Landsat Overlay, Lakes Managua (foreground) and Nicaragua (background)

Managua
Managua Department